Project Shadowchaser II, also known as Shadowchaser II, Night Scenes: Project Shadowchaser II, Night Siege and Armed And Deadly, is a 1994 science fiction film by director John Eyres. It is the second installment in the Project Shadowchaser film series.

Premise

A berserk android threatens mankind with nuclear annihilation, and three unlikely heroes must destroy it before it destroys everything.

Cast
 Frank Zagarino as Android
 Bryan Genesse as Frank Meade
 Beth Toussaint as Laurie Webber
 Daniel Bonjour as Ricky
 Todd Jensen as Joe Hutton
 Danny Keogh as John O'Hara
 Jeff Fannell as Carl Reitman
 Hal Orlandini as General McOwell
 Gavin Hood as Tieg
 Robin Smith as Prine
 Laura Steed as Red
 Frank Opperman as Wiggs
 Wilson Dunster as Edward Johnson
 Kimberleigh Stark as Carla
 Ted Le Plat as Jim Clarke
 Gideon Emery as Field Technician
 Adrian Waldron as John O'Hara's Aide
 Greg Latter as Front Gate Guard
 Steve Burgess as Jack Thompson
 Iain Winter as Jesse (as Ian Winter)
 Peter Terry as Pathologist
 Frank Notaro as Coroner
 David Butler as Police Officer
 Melanie Walker as Stewardess
 Mike Huff as Pilot
 David C. Webb as Co-Pilot (as David Webb)
 Jeff Albert as Navigator
 Douglas Bristow as Military Official
 Dan Robbertse as Truck Driver
 John Lesley as President
 Bruce Millar as Presidential Advisor #1
 Paul Beresford as Presidential Advisor #2

DVD release

The film was released on DVD in 2007 by Image Entertainment as a double feature with Project Shadowchaser III.

See also
 Project Shadowchaser
 Project Shadowchaser III
 Project Shadowchaser IV

References

External links
 

1994 films
1990s science fiction action films
American science fiction action films
American independent films
1994 independent films
Films shot in South Africa
Project Shadowchaser films
1990s English-language films
1990s American films